Oregon Route 241 (OR 241) is an Oregon state highway running from U.S. Route 101 (US 101) in Coos Bay to Nesika County Park in Coos County. OR 241 is known as the Coos River Highway No. 241 (see Oregon highways and routes).

OR 241 was established as part of Oregon's project to assign route numbers to highways that previously were not assigned.

Route description

OR 241 begins at the intersection of US 101 and Newport Avenue in an area known as Bunker Hill just south of Coos Bay. It travels east along Newport Avenue into Coos Bay and turns north onto 6th Avenue and east on D Street to leave Coos Bay. (The route is locally maintained within Coos Bay city limits.) OR 241 turns northeast again as it leaves Coos Bay, and travels through Allegany to just east of Nesika County Park, where it ends.  A county road continues to Golden and Silver Falls State Park.

History

OR 241 was assigned to the Coos River Highway on January 15, 2003, but by July 2008, OR 241 was not signed with route markers. But as of 2018, route signs have been installed at the west terminus at US 101.

Major intersections

References

241
Transportation in Coos County, Oregon